Claudia von Lanken is a German former football goalkeeper and current manager. Throughout her career she played for FFC Heike Rheine and Hamburger SV in Germany's Bundesliga. She played three matches for the German national team and was a reserve goalkeeper in the 1997 European Championship.

After retiring in 2005 she was appointed the coach of Hamburger SV's reserve team. In the 2010-11 season HSV II topped 2. Bundesliga's North group. However the reserve team was subsequently disbanded and von Lanken moved to Lokomotive Leipzig, which had been promoted to the Bundesliga. She was sacked after five weeks, with one win and four losses.

Titles
 UEFA Women's Euro: 1997

References

1977 births
Living people
German women's footballers
Germany women's international footballers
German football managers
UEFA Women's Championship-winning players
Women's association football goalkeepers
People from Schleswig, Schleswig-Holstein
Footballers from Schleswig-Holstein